Homevale is a national park in Queensland, Australia, 821 km northwest of Brisbane. The landscape is dominated by cliffs, peaks and spires.

Fossils dating from the Permian period (280-225 million years) have been found here.

The average elevation of the terrain is 436 meters.

References

See also

 Protected areas of Queensland

National parks of Queensland
Protected areas established in 1995
North Queensland
1995 establishments in Australia